Scrobipalpa proclivella is a moth of the family Gelechiidae. It is found in large parts of Europe, east to the southern Ural Mountains and Siberia.

Adults have been recorded on wing in May and from July to August in two generations per year.

The larvae feed on Achillea clavenae, Artemisia absinthium, Artemisia vulgaris, Leucanthemella serotina and Tanacetum vulgare. Young larvae create a  Phyllonorycter-like tentiform mine, with longitudinal folds. Older larvae live freely amongst spun leaves. The larvae can be found from May to June and from September to October.

References

Moths described in 1886
Scrobipalpa
Moths of Europe